Eugene O'Brien (born 22 March 1960 in Manchester) is a British auto racing driver and professional driver coach.

Career
With an engineering degree from Cambridge and a graduate apprenticeship with Rolls-Royce Motors under his belt, Eugene started his racing career in single-seaters, winning his first Formula Ford 1600 race in 1983. After finishing third in the Junior Formula Ford Series in 1983, he focussed on the engineering and set up of racing cars and even the mighty racing trucks whilst he raised the funds for the next stage of his racing career. In 1987, Eugene completed a full season in Formula First, where he finished the year as runner-up. He switched to the much more powerful Formula Vauxhall Lotus single seaters in 1988, ending his second year in the championship as runner-up. Eugene's first championship title came in 1990 with the British Sports 2000 Championship and his second championship title came in 1992, winning the Formula Forward single seater series with an astonishing ten pole positions, ten fastest laps and ten race wins.

His success earned him a drive in the hugely popular British Touring Car Championship for the 1993 season. Driving for the newly formed, factory based works Peugeot team, he competed for two seasons in the series, working with the factory race engineers to develop the Peugeot 405 touring car and finishing a creditable sixteenth, in the top half of a hugely competitive international field.

After leaving the BTCC Eugene drove a Callaway Corvette with Rocky Augusta in the 24 Hours of Le Mans, finishing third in the GT2 Class.

Turning from full time professional racing, Eugene has set up and run teams in Formula 4 and the Volkswagen Fun Cup, combining race car engineering with driver coaching. He keeps his hand in with occasional races in machinery as diverse as Citroen 2CVs to TVR Griffiths. Eugene worked with his long time motor racing mentor, Richard Usher, on the track design for Blyton Park in Lincolnshire, which Richard opened as a Sprint, Trackdays and Driving Experiences Centre in 2011.

With his wide experience of different cars and classes, as well as all the UK race tracks and many European circuits, Eugene is now focussed on driver development and coaching where his clients have ranged from historic racers to Ginetta Juniors. Having held an ARDS Grade S licence for over 20 years, and with track prepared Mazda MX5s on hand at his workshops near Silverstone,together with race car set up facilities and data logging, Eugene believes that racing drivers at all levels, like competitors in other sports like tennis, golf and horse riding, will always benefit from expert coaching.

Racing record

Complete British Touring Car Championship results
(key) (Races in bold indicate pole position) (Races in italics indicate fastest lap)

References

External links
Official site

English racing drivers
British Touring Car Championship drivers
Living people
1960 births
24 Hours of Le Mans drivers
Peugeot Sport drivers